Al Rayyan Handball Team is the handball team of Al Rayyan Sports Club, a multisport club based in Omm Alafai in the city of Al Rayyan, Qatar. It currently competes in the Qatar Handball League (QHL). The team was officially founded in 1978, eleven years after the sports club was founded.

The team has previously won the continental championship, the Asian Club League Handball Championship, on one occasion in 2012 and came runners-up in the next edition to Qatari club El Jaish.

History

Beginnings
Handball has been played in Al Rayyan Sports Club since 1962, before Al Rayyan was officially founded. In 1978, the team was officially formed, and was then overseen by Tunisian Rachid Hammami on a temporary basis for about a month, before Hassan Abou El Fadl arrived as new head coach. He coached the team for 13 years and lived in the club. Originally, starting a handball team was very difficult in Qatar, as there were no facilities specially designed for it and it was hard to persuade children to join the youth teams as it was a period where football was blooming in popularity. As a result of the lack of experienced handball players in the region, the concept of officially establishing a handball team was originally discouraged by the administrators of the club.

Over the years, Al Rayyan built a strong team, thanks to then administrator of the club, Ali bin Saeed, who also received assistance from Hassan Abou El Fadl and the team captain, Mousa Reza. Ali bin Saeed, a Kuwaiti, met a childhood friend, Matar Aman, in 1978. Matar, who was in the United Arab Emirates for 15 years, now played handball professionally and was recruited to the club along with his brothers Abdulla and Fahad.

1978–2000
Al Rayyan played their first league game, losing to Al Sadd 15-48 in 1978. Later that year, Al Rayyan won their first domestic title, with Abdulla scoring the winning goal against Al Sadd with 4 seconds left till it went to penalties. They went on to win the league title and their youth team won a domestic cup.

In the 1982-83 season, Al Rayyan achieved the impossible by winning all domestic championships in all age groups, which was 9 titles in one season. By then, the first team composed of legends like Youssef Al-Tamimi, Nasser Al-Hamid, and Mohammed al-Maliki. No other team in Qatar has accomplished a domestic triple with all age groups.

Al Rayyans squad was vastly improved in the mid-1980s. It included the likes of Fahad Aman (one of the Aman brothers), who was considered the best Qatari to ever play in the team, who could play in any position except goalkeeper and had received offers to play in German clubs. In addition, they had the Tunisian Nasser Abbasi, who was the top scorer in Africa and in Al Rayyan.

2000–present
In 2000, Al Rayyan had won its first international title by defeating Zamalek SC in the Arab Club Handball Championship, a competition where they had finished third-placed the prior year. They were also runners-up in the Asian Club League Handball Championship in 2006.

They were eligible to participate in the 2011 IHF Super Globe as the host team. However, they finished the tournament second-last on home soil. They won the 2012 Asian Handball Championship, as well as coming in runners up the very next year to rival Qatari team El Jaish.

Honours
 Qatar Handball League
 Winners (14): 1981–82, 1983–84, 1984–85, 1986–87, 1990–91, 1992–93, 1997–98, 1998–99, 1999–2000, 2002–03, 2004–05, 2007–08, 2009–10, 2011–12

 Arab Club Handball Championship
 Winners (1): 2000

 Asian Club League Handball Championship
 Winners (1): 2012

 Youth trophies (3):
 U-18: 3

Managerial history 
 Rachid Hammami (1978)
 Hassan Abou El Fadl (1978–91)
 Pero Milošević (2003–04)
 Jabbes Brahim (2011–12)
 Ilija Puljević (2013)
 Nenad Kljaić (2013–2014)
 Toni Gerona (2022–present)

Notable former players
  Darko Stanić
  Rasheed Yusuff
  Goran Stojanović
 Amine Khédira (Captain (sports)) (captain=yes) (c)
 Hamad Madadi 
 Anis Zouaoui
 Mohammed Mahmood
 Eldar Memišević
 Jovo Damjanović
 Charafeddine Boumendjel
 Hassan Mabrouk
 Youssef Benali
 Hadi Hamdoon
 Mahmoud Osman
 Issam Tej
 Frankis Carol
 Kamalaldin Mallash
 Wajdi Sinen
 Ebrahim Shebl
 Žarko Marković
 Jovan Gačević
 Mahmoud Karam

Handball

Current squad
Squad for the 2022–23 season

Goalkeepers
 12  Darko Stanić
 18  Rasheed Yusuff
 44  Goran Stojanović
Left Wingers
25  Amine Khédira (Captain (sports)) (captain=yes) (c)
 30  Hamad Madadi 
 92  Anis Zouaoui
Right Wingers
 7  Mohammed Mahmood
 14  Eldar Memišević 
Line Pivots players
 2  Jovo Damjanović
 4  Hassan Mabrouk
 41  Youssef Benali
 72  Hadi Hamdoon

Left Backs
 5  Mahmoud Osman
 13  Frankis Carol
Centre Backs
 6  Issam Tej
 24  Wajdi Sinen
 90  Ebrahim Shebl
Right Backs
 1  Žarko Marković
 11  Kamalaldin Mallash
 17  Jovan Gačević
 19  Charafeddine Boumendjel
 34  Mahmoud Karam

References

External links
 Official website 

Qatari handball clubs
Sport in Al Rayyan
1978 establishments in Qatar
Handball clubs established in 1978